Eberbach-Seltz is a commune in the Bas-Rhin department and Grand Est region of north-eastern France.

Population

See also
 Communes of the Bas-Rhin department

References

Communes of Bas-Rhin
Bas-Rhin communes articles needing translation from French Wikipedia